Ena Cremona (born 1936) is a Maltese judge. She was a judge at the European Union General Court between 12 May 2004 and 22 March 2012.

References

1936 births
Living people
Women judges
21st-century Maltese judges
General Court (European Union) judges
Maltese judges of international courts and tribunals
Maltese officials of the European Union